Tiina Inkeri Lymi (born 3 September 1971 in Tampere) is a Finnish actress, director, screenwriter and author. She received a Jussi Award as the Best Leading Actress for her work in the 1993 film Akvaariorakkaus.

Early life and education 
Tiina Lymi was born in Tampere in 1971 and grew up with her single mother. She went to the Tampere University High School.

Career 
Lymi had her first film role in 1993 in Akvaariorakkaus, receiving the Jussi Award for Best Actress. Since then, she has appeared in several films, plays and television series, and worked as a theater and television director.

Lymi also wrote a column for Aamulehti.

Personal life 
Lymi was married for 12 years to actor Eero Aho until 2006. They have two daughters, Iida (1994) and Ella (1997). Iida has appeared in the film Joki and Ella together with their parents in the film Juoksuhaudantie and in the film Käsky. Ella entered the Theater Academy in 2018 and is also studying to be an actress. During their careers, Lymi and Aho often performed together in other contexts, such as in the KOM theater and television series Vuoroin vieraissa.

Selected filmography

Akvaariorakkaus (1993)
Nousukausi (2003)
Juoksuhaudantie (2004)
Aikuisten oikeesti (2005)
Hulluna Saraan (2012)
Armi elää! (2015)

References

External links

1971 births
Living people
Actresses from Tampere
20th-century Finnish actresses
Finnish film actresses
Finnish television actresses
21st-century Finnish actresses